Verdun is a city in the Meuse département of France.

It also refers to the Battle of Verdun, fought near the above.

Verdun may also refer to:

People
 J Robert Verdun, a Canadian shareholder-rights activist
 Verdun Howell, a former Australian Rules footballer

Places

Australia
 Verdun, South Australia

Canada
 Verdun, Quebec, a borough of the City of Montreal and former municipality in Quebec
Verdun (provincial electoral district), within the borough of Verdun
Verdun (Montreal Metro), a Montreal Metro station

France
 Verdun, Ariège, in the Ariège département

Also part of the name of:
 Château-Verdun, in the Ariège département
 Verdun-en-Lauragais, in the Aude département
 Verdun-sur-Garonne, in the Tarn-et-Garonne département
 Verdun-sur-le-Doubs, in the Saône-et-Loire département

Lebanon
 Verdun, Beirut, shopping district in the capital of Lebanon

Mauritius
 Verdun, Mauritius, a village in the district of Moka, Mauritius

Slovenia
 Verdun, Novo Mesto, a settlement in the City Municipality of Novo Mesto
 Verdun pri Uršnih Selih, a settlement in the Municipality of Dolenjske Toplice

Ships
 HMS Verdun (L93), an Admiralty V destroyer of the Royal Navy
 French aircraft carrier Verdun, a projected aircraft carrier of the French navy, ordered in 1958 and later cancelled

Other
 Battle of Verdun, A major battle of World War I, often referred to simply as Verdun.
 Verdun (video game)
 Treaty of Verdun, which divided the Carolingian Empire